Kura Strickland  (December 1929 – 31 January 2014) was a Cook Islands politician and Cabinet Minister.

Strickland was born on Aitutaki and worked for the Cook Islands Trading Company and as a public servant before being elected to Parliament as one of the members for the multi-member seat of Aitutaki. He subsequently represented the seat of Amuri–Ureia. He was later elevated to Cabinet.

He was promoted to an Officer of the Order of the British Empire in the 1994 New Year Honours. He died in January 2014 of prostate cancer.

References

1929 births
2014 deaths
Date of birth missing
Government ministers of the Cook Islands
Cook Islands Party politicians
Officers of the Order of the British Empire
People from Aitutaki